A hug tunnel, also called a cuddle curtain, is a device made of plastic curtain with attached plastic tubes for the arms that allows two people to hug one another without contacting one another's pathogens. It became known during the COVID-19 pandemic in 2020. Its origins are uncertain and possibly has been re-invented in different areas; one was reported in May 2020 in England, and one in Brazil the same month.

An image of two people in São Paulo using a hug tunnel won the World Press Photo of the Year award in 2021.

See also
 Glove box

References

21st-century inventions
Scientific and technical responses to the COVID-19 pandemic